Vadim Mezga (born 31 August 1974) is a Belarusian boxer. He competed in the men's welterweight event at the 1996 Summer Olympics.

References

External links
 

1974 births
Living people
Belarusian male boxers
Olympic boxers of Belarus
Boxers at the 1996 Summer Olympics
People from Mogilev
Welterweight boxers
Sportspeople from Mogilev Region
20th-century Belarusian people